Blue Earth is a city in Faribault County, Minnesota, United States, at the confluence of the east and west branches of the Blue Earth River.  The population was 3,174 at the 2020 census. It is the county seat of Faribault County. It is home to a statue of the Jolly Green Giant. Additionally, Interstate 90 is centered on Blue Earth, as the east and west construction teams met here in 1978.  As a tribute, there is a golden stripe of concrete on the interstate near Blue Earth. This draws an analogy to the golden spike set in the first transcontinental railroad.

History
Blue Earth was platted in 1856. The city took its name from the Blue Earth River which surrounds the town. The river was given the Dakota name "Mahka-to" (meaning Blue Earth) for the blue-black clay found in the river banks.

A post office has been in operation at Blue Earth since 1856.

Attractions and community achievements

The Jolly Green Giant statue attracts over 14,000 visitors a year. In July 2007, the Blue Earth City Council approved space for a Green Giant memorabilia museum. In 2018 a building was built across from the Giant statue to house the museum, the Chamber and tourism offices, and the building is also welcome center. Lowell Steen, of Blue Earth, has collected thousands of Green Giant items and will permanently loan them to the museum.

Steinberg Nature Park is a 33-acre (13.35 ha) park located east of Blue Earth on County Road 16. The park has a half-mile (0.8 km) trail and a picnic shelter.

Prior to football playoffs the Minneapolis Star Tribune had a Coaches Poll who voted each week for the Best Football Team in the State. In 1964, 1965 and 1966, the Blue Earth High School Bucs were rated #1 for 3 consecutive years holding many of their opponents to negative total yards. In 1972, the football team went 9-1 and played in the first state football playoffs and lost. The 1990 football team finished third in Minnesota for Class A. On November 24, 2012, the 2012 football team won the division 3A championship by defeating Rochester Lourdes High School by a score of 30–7.

The Blue Earth Bucs high school wrestling program has the second-most individual state champions on record in Minnesota with 50.

On Sept. 10–12, 1999, The Order of the Arrow (OA), a group within the Boy Scouts of America, held its Section C-1A Conclave in Blue Earth. Seven OA Lodges, representing councils from Iowa, Minnesota, North Dakota and South Dakota, attended the event.

Architecture
Blue Earth is home to many examples of Midwestern architecture, including:

Faribault County Courthouse – completed in December 1892 at a cost of over $70,000.  The architect for the courthouse was C.A. Dunham of Burlington, Iowa and the contractor was S.J. Hoban from St. Paul.  The style of the courthouse is Richardsonian Romanesque. Stone used in the construction of the courthouse was transported from Kasota, Minnesota to Blue Earth by horse and wagon and rail.  Most of the sand used in the mortar was from the Blue Earth river bottom and thoroughly washed.  The pillars on the front of the building are of polished granite.  There are ledges on all four sides of the tower that are of solid stone of unknown weights of several ton each.

Episcopal Church of the Good Shepherd – 1872

First Presbyterian Church — constructed in 1897 at a cost of $12,622.75.  Designed by Kinney and Orth, architects from Austin, Minnesota. The architecture is Romanesque Revival in the arched windows, Gothic Revival in the steeples and gables, and medieval in the towers.

Salem Evangelical Church – This English country Gothic structure was completed in 1942.  Designed by Bard & Vanderbilt of Minneapolis, Minnesota.

Geography

Interstate 90 and U.S. Route 169 are two of the main routes in the city.

Demographics

2010 census
As of the census of 2010, there were 3,353 people, 1,453 households, and 888 families residing in the city. The racial makeup of the city was 96.0% White, 0.1% African American, 0.6% Native American, 0.2% Asian, 2.1% from other races, and 0.9% from two or more races. Hispanic or Latino of any race were 6.9% of the population.

There were 1,453 households, of which 25.7% had children under the age of 18 living with them, 48.0% were married couples living together, 9.9% had a female householder with no husband present, 3.2% had a male householder with no wife present, and 38.9% were non-families. 35.5% of all households were made up of individuals, and 20% had someone living alone who was 65 years of age or older. The average household size was 2.19 and the average family size was 2.81.

The median age in the city was 46.4 years. 21.4% of residents were under the age of 18; 6.9% were between the ages of 18 and 24; 20.4% were from 25 to 44; 26.7% were from 45 to 64; and 24.7% were 65 years of age or older. The gender makeup of the city was 46.8% male and 53.2% female.

2000 census
As of the census of 2000, there were 3,621 people, 1,535 households, and 925 families residing in the city. The racial makeup of the city was 96.85% White, 0.17% African American, 0.06% Native American, 0.33% Asian, 0.19% Pacific Islander, 1.60% from other races, and 0.80% from two or more races. Hispanic or Latino of any race were 4.14% of the population.

There were 1,535 households, out of which 27.6% had children under the age of 18 living with them, 49.8% were married couples living together, 7.9% had a female householder with no husband present, and 39.7% were non-families. 36.3% of all households were made up of individuals, and 20.7% had someone living alone who was 65 years of age or older.  The average household size was 2.23 and the average family size was 2.92.

In the city, the population was spread out, with 23.1% under the age of 18, 6.5% from 18 to 24, 21.9% from 25 to 44, 22.7% from 45 to 64, and 25.8% who were 65 years of age or older.  The median age was 44 years. For every 100 females, there were 84.3 males.  For every 100 females age 18 and over, there were 78.4 males.

The median income for a household in the city was $34,940, and the median income for a family was $42,377. Males had a median income of $29,359 versus $20,168 for females. The per capita income for the city was $18,037.  About 4.3% of families and 8.0% of the population were below the poverty line, including 9.1% of those under age 18 and 10.1% of those age 65 or over.

Notable people

Donald Deskey, Industrial and interior designer
Arlen Erdahl, Minnesota politician
Geri Evans, Minnesota state legislator
Jim Hagedorn, Congressman
Tom Hagedorn, Congressman
Daniel D. Murphy, Minnesota state legislator
John M. Patton. Minnesota state legislator
Pat Piper, Minnesota state legislator
Frank E. Putnam, Minnesota state legislator
Georgette Valle, Washington state legislator
William Zakariasen, Music critic for the New York Daily News
Al DeLeon, Wrestler

In popular culture
The Minnesota-based alt-country band The Jayhawks titled their second album Blue Earth (1989). The opening lines of the album's second track, “She’s Not Alone Anymore,” make direct reference to the town: “Hitchhiked back from Blue Earth / She’s not alone anymore.”

In her memoir, The Daughter of the Queen of Sheba (Penguin, 1998), Jacki Lyden mentions how she was captivated by the town's name: “I thought we could stay like this forever…reading the boxcars emblazoned with the words Soo Line and Blue Earth Minnesota. Blue Earth Minnesota. I’d never heard of anyplace so beautiful.”

Blue Earth, Minnesota, was mentioned in CNN's "That's Random" segment of the network's CNN10 production which aired on November 29, 2017.

Petoskey's Sports Bar, a Midwest-themed bar in Seattle, Washington, features a vegetable pizza on their menu named after Blue Earth, Minnesota, because of the town's association with agriculture and the Jolly Green Giant.

A former funeral home in the town was featured on HGTV's Ugliest House in America special event on January 3, 2022.

References

External links

Blue Earth, MN -- Official site
Blue Earth Chamber of Commerce

Cities in Minnesota
Cities in Faribault County, Minnesota
County seats in Minnesota